L&T Technology Services (LTTS) is an Indian multinational technology company that provides engineering research and development (ER&D) services, headquartered in Vadodara. The company's business interests include automotive engineering, embedded system and semiconductor engineering, industrial internet of things, manufacturing plant engineering, and medical engineering.

LTTS is a subsidiary of the conglomerate Larsen & Toubro (L&T), and listed on the National Stock Exchange and the Bombay Stock Exchange. The company has offices across India, United States, Europe, and Asia. It has a subsidiary company Esencia, based in San Jose, California.

History 
L&T Technology Services (LTTS) was founded in 2006 as L&T Integrated Engineering Services. In its first year, the company generated $70 million in revenue. Initially, it only operated as the engineering arm of the L&T and in 2013, as a result of the L&T's strategy, the parent company was split into "nine verticals and six subsidiaries", of which this was one. It began to expand its engineering services as a developer of new technology solutions for other companies under a new brand name L&T Technology Services (LTTS).

In September 2016, LTTS had its initial public offering in the National Stock Exchange, making it the second L&T subsidiary to go public. A. M. Naik, the current group chairman of the parent company, remained chairman of the subsidiary until his retirement in October 2017. Keshab Panda was named as the CEO and managing director  and S.N.Subrahmanyan as vice chairman of the company.

In 2016, LTTS developed a set of personal safety gear that is based on cloud-enabled technologies. The system includes a set of "helmets, gloves, jackets and shoes that have sensors capturing [the wearers] performance, and sending it to a centralized database on the cloud."

In March 2017, it opened a center of excellence in Munich, Germany. In June 2017, LTTS completed the acquisition of the Esencia, a San Jose, California-based engineering firm involved in development of "wireless connectivity solutions, perceptual computing, Internet of Things and advanced silicon products" for $27 million. In July, the company was upgraded to Group A of the Bombay Stock Exchange.

In May 2022, the company opened an engineering, research and development (ER&D) centre in Krakow, Poland. In June 2022, LTTS set up an engineering design centre in Toulouse, France.

In January 2023, LTTS announced that it would acquire parent Larsen & Toubro's "Smart World & Communication" business segment, which has interests in communication networks, cybersecurity and smart spaces, for 800 crore.

See also 

 LTIMindtree
 KPIT Technologies

References

External links 
 

Engineering companies of India
Larsen & Toubro
Indian companies established in 2013
2013 establishments in Maharashtra
Companies listed on the National Stock Exchange of India
Companies listed on the Bombay Stock Exchange